Brianaria is a lichen genus in the family Psoraceae. It was circumscribed in 2014 by Stefan Ekman and Måns Svensson to contain four closely related species formerly in the Micarea sylvicola group.

Description
Characteristics of the genus Brianaria include the small, convex apothecia that lack an excipulum; an ascus of the ‘Psora-type’; 0–1-septate ascospores, dimorphic paraphyses, and immersed pycnidia that contain bacilliform conidia. The photobiont is chlorococcoid, and non-micareoid.

Species
Brianaria bauschiana 
Brianaria lutulata 
Brianaria sylvicola 
Brianaria tuberculata

References

Lecanorales
Lichen genera
Lecanorales genera
Taxa described in 2014